Yevgeni Aleksandrovich Landyrev (born 29 August 1977) is a former Russian professional footballer.

Club career
He made his professional debut in the Russian Third League in 1997 for FC Kuban Slavyansk-na-Kubani. He played 1 game in the UEFA Intertoto Cup 1999 for FC Rostselmash Rostov-on-Don.

Honours 

 Latvian Higher League runner-up: 2000, 2001, 2002
 Latvian Higher League 3rd place: 2004

References

1977 births
People from Primorsko-Akhtarsky District
Living people
Russian footballers
Russian Premier League players
First Professional Football League (Bulgaria) players
FC Rostov players
FK Ventspils players
PFC Litex Lovech players
FC Oryol players
FC Kuban Krasnodar players
Russian expatriate footballers
Expatriate footballers in Latvia
Expatriate footballers in Bulgaria
Russian expatriate sportspeople in Bulgaria
FC Slavyansk Slavyansk-na-Kubani players
Association football forwards
Sportspeople from Krasnodar Krai